The Phasianidae are a family of heavy, ground-living birds, which includes pheasants, partridges, junglefowl, chickens, turkeys, Old World quail, and peafowl. The family includes many of the most popular gamebirds. The family is a large one and includes 185 species divided into 54 genera. It was formerly broken up into two subfamilies, the Phasianinae and the Perdicinae. However, this treatment is now known to be paraphyletic and polyphyletic, respectively,  and more recent evidence supports breaking it up into two subfamilies: Rollulinae and Phasianinae, with the latter containing multiple tribes within two clades. The New World quail (Odontophoridae) and guineafowl (Numididae) were formerly sometimes included in this family, but are now typically placed in families of their own; conversely, grouse and turkeys, formerly often treated as distinct families (Tetraonidae and Meleagrididae, respectively), are now known to be deeply nested within Phasianidae, so they are now included in the present family.

Description
Phasianids are terrestrial. Generally, sexual dimorphism is greater in larger-sized birds, with males tending to be larger than females. They are generally plump, with broad, relatively short wings and powerful legs. Many have a spur on each leg, most prominently with junglefowl (including chickens), pheasants, turkeys, and peafowl. Some, like quails, partridges, and grouse, have reduced spurs to none at all. A few have two spurs on each of their legs instead of one, including peacock-pheasants and spurfowl. The bill is short and compact, particularly in species that dig deep in the earth for food such as the Mearns quail. Males of the bigger galliform species often boast brightly-coloured plumage, as well as facial ornaments such as combs, wattles, and/or crests.

Distribution and habitat
The Phasianidae are mostly an Old World family, with a distribution that includes most of Europe and Asia (except the far north), all of Africa except the driest deserts, and south into much of eastern Australia and (formerly) New Zealand. The Meleagridini (turkeys) are native to the New World, while the Tetraonini (grouse) are circumpolar; both of these are members of Phasianinae. The greatest diversity of species is in Southeast Asia and Africa. The Congo peacock is specific to the African Congo.

Overall, Rollulinae is restricted to the tropics of East & Southeast Asia and the mountains of Tanzania, Phasianinae have a circumpolar range in the temperate zones of both Eurasia and North America (but also range into the tropics of east and southeast Asia), and Pavoninae have a wide range across Africa, Eurasia, and Australasia in both temperate and tropical zones.

The family is generally sedentary and resident, although some members of the group undertake long migrations, like ptarmigans and Old World quail. Several species in the family have been widely introduced around the world, particularly pheasants, which have been introduced to Europe, Australia, and the Americas, specifically for hunting purposes. Captive populations of peafowl, domestic chickens, and turkeys have also escaped or been released and became feral.

Behaviour and ecology
The phasianids have a varied diet, with foods taken ranging from purely vegetarian diets of seeds, leaves, fruits, tubers, and roots, to small animals including insects, insect grubs, and even small reptiles. Most species either specialise in feeding on plant matter or are predatory, although the chicks of most species are insectivorous.

In addition to the variation in diet, a considerable amount of variation exists in breeding strategies among the Phasianidae. Compared to birds in general, a large number of species do not engage in monogamy (the typical breeding system of most birds). The francolins of Africa and some partridges are reportedly monogamous, but polygamy has been reported in the pheasants and junglefowl, some quail, and the breeding displays of peacocks have been compared to those of a lek. Nesting usually occurs on the ground; only the tragopans nest higher up in trees or stumps of bushes. Nests can vary from mounds of vegetation to slight scrapes in the ground. As many as 20 eggs can be laid in the nest, although 7-12 are the more usual numbers, with smaller numbers in tropical species. Incubation times can range from 14–30 days depending on the species, and is almost always done solely by the hen, although a few involve the male partaking in caring for the eggs and chicks, like the willow ptarmigan and bobwhite quail.

Relationship with humans
The red junglefowl of Southeast Asia is the undomestic ancestor of the domesticated chicken, the most important bird in agriculture, and the wild turkey similarly is the ancestor of the domestic turkey. Several species of pheasants and partridges are extremely important to humans. Ring-necked pheasants, several partridge and quail species, and some francolins have been widely introduced and managed as game birds for hunting. Several species are threatened by human activities.

Systematics and evolution

The clade Phasianidae is the largest of the branch Galliformes, comprising 185 species divided into 54 genera. This group includes the pheasants and partridges, junglefowl chickens, quail, and peafowl. Turkeys and grouse have also been recognized as having their origins in the pheasant- and partridge-like birds.

Until the early 1990s, this family was broken up into two subfamilies: the Phasianinae, including pheasants, tragopans, junglefowls, and peafowls; and the Perdicinae, including partridges, Old World quails, and francolins.   Molecular phylogenies have shown that these two subfamilies are not each monophyletic, but actually constitute only one lineage with one common ancestor. For example, some partridges (genus Perdix) are more closely affiliated to pheasants, whereas Old World quails and partridges from the genus Alectoris are closer to junglefowls.

The earliest fossil records of phasianids date to the late Oligocene epoch, about 30 million years ago.

Recent genera 
Taxonomy and ordering is based on Kimball et al., 2021, which was accepted by the International Ornithological Congress. Tribes and subfamily names are based on the 4th edition of the Howard and Moore Complete Checklist of the Birds of the World. Genera without a tribe are considered to belong to tribe incertae sedis.
 Subfamily Rollulinae 
Xenoperdix Dinesen et al., 1994 (forest partridges)
Caloperdix Blyth, 1861 (ferruginous partridge)
Rollulus Bonnaterre, 1791 (crested partridges)
Melanoperdix Jerdon, 1864 (black partridge)
Arborophila Hodgson, 1837 (hill partridges)
Subfamily Phasianinae
Phasianinae "Erectile clade" 
Lerwa Hodgson, 1837 (snow partridge)
Ithaginis Wagler, 1832 (blood pheasant)
Tribe Lophophorini 
Tragopan Cuvier, 1829 non Gray 1841 (tragopans)
Tetraophasis Elliot, 1871 (monal-partridges)
Lophophorus Temminck, 1813 non Agassiz 1846 (monals)
Pucrasia Gray, 1841 (koklass pheasant)
Tribe Tetraonini 
Meleagris Linnaeus, 1758 (turkeys)
Bonasa Stephens, 1819 (ruffed grouse)
 Tetrastes Keyserling & Blasius, 1840 (hazel grouse)
 Centrocercus Swainson, 1832 (sage-grouse)
 Dendragapus Elliot, 1864 (blue grouse)
 Tympanuchus Gloger, 1841 (prairie-chickens and sharp-tailed grouse)
 Lagopus Brisson, 1760 (ptarmigans)
 Falcipennis Elliot, 1864 (Siberian grouse)
Canachites Stejneger, 1885 (spruce grouse)
 Tetrao Linnaeus, 1758 (capercaillies)
 Lyrurus Swainson, 1832 (black grouse)
Rhizothera Gray, 1841
Perdix Brisson, 1760 (true partridges)
Tribe Phasianini 
Syrmaticus Wagler, 1832 (long-tailed pheasants)
Chrysolophus Gray, 1834 (ruffed pheasants)
Phasianus Linnaeus, 1758 (true pheasants)
Catreus Cabanis, 1851 (cheer pheasant)
 Crossoptilon Hodgson, 1838 (eared pheasants)
Lophura Fleming, 1822 non Gray, 1827 non Walker, 1856 (gallopheasants)
Phasianinae "Nonerectile clade" 
Tribe Pavonini 
Rheinardia Maingonnat, 1882 (crested arguses)
 Argusianus Rafinesque, 1815 (great argus)
Afropavo Chapin, 1936 (African peafowl)
 Pavo Linnaeus, 1758 (Asiatic peafowl)
Tropicoperdix Blyth, 1859
Haematortyx Sharpe, 1879 (crimson-headed partridge)
Galloperdix Blyth, 1845 (Indian spurfowls)
Tribe Polyplectronini 
Polyplectron Temminck, 1807 (peacock-pheasants)
Tribe Gallini 
Bambusicola Gould, 1863 (bamboo partridges)
Gallus Brisson, 1760 (junglefowl, including the domestic chicken)
Peliperdix Bonaparte, 1856 (Latham's francolin)
Ortygornis Reichenbach, 1852
Francolinus Stephens, 1819 
Campocolinus Crowe et al., 2020 
Scleroptila Blyth, 1852
Tribe Coturnicini 
Tetraogallus Gray, 1832 (snowcocks)
Ammoperdix Gould, 1851 (see-see and sand partridges)
 Synoicus Bosc, 1792
Margaroperdix Reichenbach, 1853
 Coturnix Garsault, 1764 (typical Old World quails)
Alectoris Kaup, 1829 (rock partridges)
Perdicula Hodgson, 1837 (bush-quails)
Ophrysia Bonaparte, 1856 (Himalayan quail)
Pternistis Wagler, 1832 (partridge-francolins; African spurfowls)

Past taxonomy 
This is the paraphyletic former ordering of Phasianidae, which primarily grouped genera based on appearance and body plans.
Subfamily Perdicinae Horsfield, 1821
 Xenoperdix Dinesen et al., 1994 (forest partridges)
Caloperdix Blyth, 1861
Rollulus Bonnaterre, 1791 (crested partridges)
Melanoperdix Jerdon, 1864
Arborophila Hodgson, 1837 (hill partridges)
 Rhizothera Gray, 1841
 Lerwa Hodgson, 1837
 Tropicoperdix Blyth, 1859
 Ammoperdix Gould 1851 (see-see and sand partridges)
 Synoicus Bosc 1792
 Margaroperdix Reichenbach 1853
 Coturnix Garsault 1764 (typical Old World quails)
 Tetraogallus Gray 1832 (snowcocks)
 Alectoris Kaup 1829 (rock partridges)
 Pternistis Wagler 1832 (partridge-francolins; African spurfowls)
 Ophrysia Bonaparte 1856
 Perdicula Hodgson 1837 (bush-quails)
 Bambusicola Gould 1863 (bamboo partridges)
 Scleroptila Blyth 1852
 Peliperdix Bonaparte 1856
 Francolinus Stephens 1819 (true francolins)
Ortygornis Reichenbach, 1852
Campocolinus Crowe et al 2020 
 Perdix Brisson, 1760 (true partridges)
 Haematortyx Sharpe, 1879
 Galloperdix Blyth, 1845 (Indian spurfowls)
 Tetraophasis Elliot, 1871 (monal-partridges)
 Subfamily Meleagridinae
 Meleagris Linnaeus, 1758 (turkeys)
 Subfamily Phasianinae (pheasants, peafowl, junglefowl, monals, and tragopans)
 Polyplectron Temminck, 1807 (peacock-pheasants)
 Gallus Brisson, 1760 (junglefowl, including the domestic chicken)
 Ithaginis Wagler, 1832
 Pucrasia Gray, 1841 (koklass pheasant)
 Tragopan Cuvier, 1829 non Gray 1841 (tragopans)
 Lophophorus Temminck, 1813 non Agassiz, 1846 (monals)
 Rheinardia Maingonnat 1882
 Argusianus Rafinesque 1815 (argus pheasants)
 Afropavo Chapin, 1936 (African peafowl)
 Pavo Linnaeus, 1758 (Asiatic peafowl)
 Syrmaticus Wagler, 1832 (long-tailed pheasants)
 Phasianus Linnaeus, 1758 (true pheasants)
 Chrysolophus Gray, 1834 (ruffed pheasants)
 Lophura Fleming, 1822 non Gray, 1827 non Walker, 1856 (gallopheasants)
 Catreus Cabanis, 1851
 Crossoptilon Hodgson, 1838 (eared pheasants)
 Subfamily Tetraoninae (grouse)
  Bonasa Stephens, 1819 (ruffed grouse)
 Tetrastes Keyserling & Blasius, 1840 (hazel grouse)
 Centrocercus Swainson 1832 (sage-grouse)
 Dendragapus Elliot, 1864 (blue grouse)
 Tympanuchus Gloger, 1841 (prairie-chickens and sharp-tailed grouse)
 Lagopus Brisson, 1760 (ptarmigans)
 Falcipennis Elliot, 1864 (Siberian grouse)
Canachites Stejneger, 1885 (spruce grouse)
 Tetrao Linnaeus, 1758 (capercaillies)
 Lyrurus Swainson, 1832 (black grouse)

Fossil genera 
Extinct genus assignment follows the Mikko's Phylogeny Archive and Paleofile.com websites.
†Alectoris” pliocaena Tugarinov, 1940 
 †Bantamyx Kuročkin, 1982 
 †Centuriavis Ksepka, Early, Dzikiewicz & Balanoff, 2022 
 †Diangallus Hou, 1985 
 †“Gallus” beremendensis Jánossy, 1976 
 †“Gallus” europaeus Harrison, 1978 
 †Lophogallus Zelenkov & Kuročkin, 2010 
 †Megalocoturnix Sánchez Marco, 2009 
 †Miophasianus Brodkorb, 1952  [Miophasianus Lambrecht 1933 nomen nudum ; Miogallus Lambrecht 1933]
 †Palaeocryptonyx Depéret, 1892  [Chauvireria Boev 1997; Pliogallus Tugarinov 1940b non Gaillard 1939; Lambrechtia Janossy, 1974 ]
 †Palaeortyx Milne-Edwards, 1869  [Palaeoperdix Milne-Edwards, 1869]
 †Panraogallus Li et al., 2018 
 †Plioperdix Kretzoi, 1955  [Pliogallus Tugarinov 1940 non Gaillard 1939]
 †Rustaviornis Burchak-Abramovich & Meladze, 1972 
 †Schaubortyx Brodkorb, 1964 
 †Shandongornis Yeh, 1997 
 †Shanxiornis Wang et al., 2006 
 †Tologuica Zelenkov & Kuročkin, 2009
Tribe Tetraonini (grouse)
†Cynchramus Zelenkov Bonaparte, 1828
  †Palaealectoris Zelenkov Wetmore, 1930
†Proagriocharis Zelenkov Martin & Tate, 1970
  †Rhegminornis Zelenkov Wetmore, 1943

Phylogeny
Cladogram based on a 2021 study by De Chen and collaborators that sequenced DNA flanking ultra-conserved elements. The extinct Himalayan quail (genus Ophrysia) was not included in the study. The species numbers and the inclusion of the genera Canachites, Ortygornis, Campocolinus and Synoicus follows the list maintained by Frank Gill, Pamela Rasmussen and David Donsker on behalf of the International Ornithologists' Union.

References

External links 
Phasianidae videos on the Internet Bird Collection

 
Bird families
 
Extant Rupelian first appearances
Taxa named by Thomas Horsfield